Otto Przywara (20 September 1914 – 14 November 2000) was a German swimmer. He competed in two events at the 1936 Summer Olympics. As his surname sounded too Polish he took the German name Kutz during World War II.

References

1914 births
2000 deaths
German male swimmers
Olympic swimmers of Germany
Swimmers at the 1936 Summer Olympics
People from Świętochłowice
Sportspeople from Silesian Voivodeship
German people of Polish descent